Regions of Spain can refer to:
The autonomous communities of Spain, first-level political subdivisions of Spain
A Spanish constitutional designation of certain autonomous communities (see nationalities and regions of Spain)
The "historic regions" of Spain under the 1833 territorial division of Spain

See also
Nationalities and regions of Spain
Nationalisms and regionalisms of Spain